Engel Modderman (1 October 1951) is a Dutch communist politician and activist.

Career
Until 1999, Modderman was active on behalf of the New Communist Party of the Netherlands (NCPN), of which he was also a member of the national board and the lijsttrekker in the 1998 Dutch general election.

In 1999, Modderman and the NCPN came into conflict over the Blauwestad construction project and he founded the United Communist Party (VCP), of which he has been political leader ever since. Resistance against Blauwestad remained one of the spearheads of the VCP. Later, as a municipal councilor, Modderman protested against the new construction of cultural center De Klinker in Winschoten and against the extraction of gas from the Slochteren natural gas field. Modderman is leader of the VCP in the municipal council of Oldambt, where his party has been represented with four seats since 2014. In the 2014 Dutch municipal elections, Modderman received the most votes of all politicians in Oldambt, after which talks started about the formation of a college with the Socialist Party (SP), Party for the North (PvhN), and VCP. The latter left the negotiations, however, and the SP and PvhN formed a coalition with the Labour Party and the Christian Democratic Appeal instead.

On May 14, 2018, Modderman was appointed as acting chairman of the municipal council after the sudden death of mayor Pieter Smit.

References

1951 births
Living people
Dutch communists
Communist Party of the Netherlands politicians
Municipal councillors in Groningen (province)